PP&L may refer to:

PPL Corporation, formerly Pennsylvania Power and Light
Pacific Power & Light, the former name of PacifiCorp